Intetics is a IT outsourcing company headquartered in Naples, Florida with software development centers in Europe in Belarus (Minsk), Ukraine (Kharkiv, Kyiv and Lviv) and Poland (Kraków), branch offices in United States (Wilmette, Illinois), Germany (Düsseldorf), and a representative office in UK (London).

History 
The company was founded in 1995 by Boris Kontsevoi in Minsk. Today Intetics specializes in the establishment and operation of offshore dedicated teams for application development, GIS, systems integration, engineering, data processing and back-office support.

In 2010 Belarusian production branch of Intetics becomes a resident at the Belarusian Hi-Tech Park.

In 2016 Intetics introduces the new framework in software development, Predictive Software Engineering.

Community involvement
Intetics is one of the largest IT companies in Belarus.

Awards 

 IAOP's Global Outsourcing 100 (2006-2008, 2010–2017, 2019–2020)
 Software Magazine's Software 500 Company (2010-2018)
 CV Magazine's Software & Technology Innovation Award 2016

References

Companies based in Cook County, Illinois
Companies established in 1995
Outsourcing companies
Software companies based in Illinois
Software companies of Belarus
Software companies of Ukraine
Software companies based in Florida
Software companies of the United States
1995 establishments in the United States
1995 establishments in Illinois
Software companies established in 1995
Belarusian companies established in 1995